Twopence or tuppence may refer to:

 Two pence (or pennies) in British coinage, or the specific coins:
 Twopence (British pre-decimal coin)
 Two pence (British decimal coin)
 Tuppence (detective), a recurring character in the works of Agatha Christie
 Tuppence Middleton, an English actress
 'Tuppence' Moran, a nickname for Desmond Moran, member of the Moran family of Melbourne-based criminals
 My two penn'orth, an idiomatic expression

See also
 Thruppence